Centro de Investigación y Desarrollo Tecnológico en Electroquímica (CIDETEQ, and in English: Center of Research and Technologic Development in Electrochemistry) is one of 27 Public Research Centers in Mexico, funded by CONACyT. It was founded on 1991.

Academic

 Master in Electrochemistry
 Master in Science and Technology
 Doctorade in Electrochemistry
 Doctorade in Science and Technology

Research Areas

 Electrochemistry
 Energy
 Environmental

References

Education in Mexico
Public universities and colleges in Mexico
Universities and colleges in Querétaro